Edinbane (Scottish Gaelic: An t-Aodann Bàn the fair hill-face) is a small village on the island of Skye, Scotland.

Location
The name An t-Aodann Bàn is said to be taken from the white bog cotton plants that can be found on the hill sides. The village is based around the crofts with a small primary school and pottery. Notable buildings in Edinbane village are the former Gesto Hospital (c. 1870), the Edinbane Inn (c. 1900) and Edinbane Lodge, a stone-built hunting lodge built in 1543.

History
There has been a settlement here since before 1600, but it was Kenneth MacLeod of Greshornish (1 December 1809, died unmarried in 1869) who founded the village.

Kenneth MacLeod of Greshornish
Kenneth McLeod's family had farmed land in the Gesto area of Skye for over 500 years. At the age of 15 he went to India, with his fare paid out and one golden guinea in his pocket, given him by Mrs MacDonald of Waternish. After a year's work, he took the river boat down to Calcutta. On the way he went ashore and visited a place where an auction of the contents of a sugar factory was in progress. With his precious Guinea, he bought a copper boiler, which he sold in Calcutta for £30. He now returned to the derelict sugar factory and bought it for very little. This set him on the ladder to making a fortune in India planting indigo. 

Returning to Skye, he endeavoured to buy the tack of Gesto but MacLeod of MacLeod was not prepared to sell. Kenneth then bought Orbost, Isle of Skye, Edinbane, Skirinish, Greshornishy, Tote and Skeabost and much of Portree. He ensured that the village had a tradesman from each of the important crafts. He set up the first hospital on Skye in Edinbane, aptly named Gesto. It is now boarded up.

Edinbane Lodge
Edinbane Lodge is the oldest coaching inn on the Isle of Skye, dating from 1543. Originally known as Tigh A Linne it operated as one of three change houses for travellers on their way between Portree and Dunvegan. It was purchased by Kenneth MacLeod of Greshornish in the 1860s and converted into a hunting lodge. In 1920 the Lodge was purchased by Edward Langdale Hilleary, a wealthy London businessman, and his wife Edith (née Robertson), niece of Kenneth MacLeod. In 1927 Edward Langdale Hilleary constructed a small hydro plant on the Abhainn Coishletter just behind the Lodge. The scheme supplied electricity to the nearby Gesto hospital and also powered the Lodge. Among other uses, Edinbane Lodge has served as the land court for the surrounding area, where people were tried for various offences including sheep rustling and more serious crimes. If found guilty and sentenced to death, the accused were hanged in the garden grounds.

Wind farm fire
On 24–25 April 2019, a major fire burned  of forestry at Edinbane wind farm.

References

Further reading
John MacInnes (2015) Edinbane township, Isle of Skye: an island community and its people; 2nd ed. John MacInnes Associates

External links

BBC - Domesday Reloaded - Edinbane, Hebridean Township
Renewables Map - Edinbane Wind Farm
Edinbane Lodge

Populated places in the Isle of Skye